Chief Secretary may refer to:

Current posts 
Chief Secretary (India), a senior civil servant in the states and union territories of India
Chief Secretary (Pakistan), the highest-ranking civil servant in the provinces and administrative units of Pakistan, including:
Chief Secretary Balochistan
Chief Secretary Khyber Pakhtunkhwa
Chief Secretary Punjab
Chief Secretary Sindh
Chief Secretary (Sri Lanka), a senior civil servant in the provinces of Sri Lanka
Chief Secretary for Administration, the head of the Government Secretariat of Hong Kong
Chief Secretary of the Isle of Man, the head of the Isle of Man Civil Service
Chief Secretary of Tobago, the leader of the Tobagonian government
Chief Secretary to the Government, the most senior officer in the Malaysian Civil Service
Chief Secretary to the Treasury, a senior minister in the Cabinet of the United Kingdom
Chief Secretary of Asanteman, the title of the administrative officer of the Ashanti traditional kingdom in Ghana, held by the father of Joe Appiah

Defunct posts 
Chief Secretary (British Empire), civil-servant title in colonies of the British Empire
Chief Secretary, Singapore, a high-ranking government civil position in colonial Singapore
Chief Secretary of New South Wales, an office in the colonial and state administration in New South Wales
Chief Secretary of South Australia, an office in the colonial and state administration in South Australia
Chief Secretary, second name for the former Colonial Secretary of Western Australia
Chief Secretary for Ireland, an office in the British administration in Ireland

See also 
 Chief Cabinet Secretary
 Chief of Staff
 General Secretary
Permanent secretary
Private secretary
 Provincial Secretary
 Principal Private Secretary
 Principal Secretary (disambiguation)
 Secretary (disambiguation)